The Software Exchange was a company that produced computer games in the late 1970s and early 1980s, primarily for the TRS-80. It has origins with SoftSide magazine.

Games
Atlantic Balloon Crossing (1979)
Dragon-Quest Adventure (1979)
Lost Dutchman's Gold (1979)
Star Trek III.4 (1979)
Westward 1847 (1979)
Invasion From Outer Space (1980)
The Mean Checkers Machine (1980)
Round the Horn (1980)

References

Defunct video game companies of the United States